Rosecrans Air National Guard Base or Rosecrans ANGB, is located on a portion of the Rosecrans Memorial Airport , Saint Joseph, Missouri, USA. It is the home of the 139th Airlift Wing, Missouri Air National Guard and the Advanced Airlift Tactics Training Center. It is named in honor of Guy Wallace Rosecrans, a U.S. Army Air Service airman killed in World War I.

History
During World War II, the U.S. Army Air Forces established Rosecrans Field, also called St. Joseph Army Air Field, at Rosecrans Memorial Airport. The Ferrying Division, Air Transport Command took over the field on July 6, 1942. It became the home for the 1st Operational Training Unit (OTU) composed of the 561st Army Air Force (AAF) Base Unit, Headquarters and Headquarters Squadron, 61st Aircraft Engineering Squadron, 993rd Guard Squadron, 730th AAF Band, 50th Transport Transition Squadron, Medical and WAC Detachments and the 562nd Training Squadron.

In 1947, control of the base shifted from the Army to the newly established U.S. Air Force.  In 1948, the base was conveyed by the Air Force back to the City of Saint Joseph, Missouri with the exception of  set aside for use by the Air National Guard organized in 1947. Some of the old temporary World War II era barracks were still present on the base until the Great Flood of 1993 when they were destroyed.

Current use
The base's host wing, the 139th Airlift Wing (139 AW) of the Missouri Air National Guard, currently operates C-130H2 Hercules theater airlift aircraft and is operationally-gained by the Air Mobility Command (AMC). The Advanced Airlift Tactics Training Center (AATTC) is a tenant activity at the base that provides current academic and combat flying tactics and training to C-130 airlift air crews of the Air National Guard, the Air Force Reserve Command, active duty USAF, sister services and allied nations. This training enhances air crew survivability and mission success in a combat environment.

See also
 180th Airlift Squadron
 241st Air Traffic Control Squadron
 Missouri Wing, Civil Air Patrol – Pony Express Composite Squadron

References

External links
 Rosecrans Memorial Airport
 139th Airlift Wing
 Advanced Airlift Tactics Training Center
 Air Force Link – Sites

Airports in Missouri
Buildings and structures in St. Joseph, Missouri
Installations of the United States Air Force in Missouri
Installations of the United States Air National Guard